BEG may refer to:

Transportation
 BEG, IATA code for Belgrade Nikola Tesla Airport in Serbia
 Bayerische Eisenbahngesellschaft, the state rail transport authority for Bavaria

Other uses
 Bengal Engineer Group or Bombay Engineer Group, regiments of the Corps of Engineers of the Indian Army
 Brown Eyed Girls, a South Korean girl group

See also
Beg (disambiguation)